Bill Lebold Harbert (July 21, 1923 – June 27, 2010) was an American  businessman and founder of the international construction firm B.L. Harbert International. He was the brother of businessman John M. Harbert.

Life
Harbert was born in Indianola, Mississippi on July 21, 1923. Soon after his family moved to Birmingham, Alabama, Harbert enrolled at Auburn University, where he graduated in 1948 after serving in World War II.

Following his graduation from Auburn, he and his older brother, John M. Harbert, founded Harbert Construction Company. The company, which later changed its name to Harbert Corporation, became one of the world's largest construction and engineering companies. In the early 1990s Harbert Corporation sold its domestic construction division to Raytheon in an effort to focus more on investment management. Soon after, the international division was sold to Bill Harbert. The international division became part of Bill Harbert International Construction (BHIC) in 1991. In 2000, Bill Harbert retired and assets of BHIC were sold. The company changed its name to B.L. Harbert International and is headed by Bill's son Billy Harbert.

On June 27, 2010, Harbert died at the age of 86 in Birmingham, Alabama. He was survived by his son Bill L. Harbert Jr. and his daughters Anne Harbert Moulton, and Elizabeth Harbert Cornay.

References

1923 births
2010 deaths
People from Vestavia Hills, Alabama
Auburn University alumni
American military personnel of World War II
Harbert family
People from Indianola, Mississippi